Kamppi is a neighbourhood in the centre of Helsinki, the capital of Finland. The name originally referred to a small area known as the "Kamppi field" (see below), but according to the current official designation, "Kamppi" encompasses a much larger area with a population of 10,000 in 2004.

The heart of Kamppi is a part of the Central Business District. However, in stark contrast to the other districts of central Helsinki, development in Kamppi was sporadic and the very centre of Kamppi remained entirely undeveloped until 2002.

The name "Kamppi" is derived from the Swedish word for battle, kamp. Under Russian rule in the 19th century, Kamppi was mainly used as a military area by Russian forces, with barracks and training fields, which the name refers to. This so-called "Kamppi field" in the centre of Kamppi was also the location of a market run by Jewish merchants from the late 19th century until 1929 when it was shut down. A new pedestrian plaza on the same site, completed in 2005 as part of a recent redevelopment project, has been officially named Narinkka Square which comes from the name that the old Jewish market had. The name for the Jewish market has its background in the Russian language, as many of the Jewish merchants came from Russia and spoke Russian. In Russian language, "на рынке" (na rinke) means "on the market". The Finnish speaking people began to call the place "narinkka" and the name stuck to the place with few people today knowing the original meaning of the word.

The reputable Ressu Upper Secondary School as well as the Helsinki Old Church and its adjacent park are located in the district of Kamppi. There are also two hotels in Kamppi area: Hotel Marski and Hotel Torni.

The central bus station of Helsinki is located in a modern terminal built entirely underground in Kamppi, and the Helsinki railway station is located only a few hundred metres away. A popular destination in Kamppi is Tennispalatsi, the largest cinema multiplex in Helsinki.

Since August 2002, the centre of Kamppi was occupied by the largest single construction site in the history of Finland. The first phase of the project, the underground bus terminal, was opened to the public in June 2005. Completed in March 2006, the Kamppi Center also houses high-quality apartments and a large shopping mall. In 2012 the Kamppi Chapel was opened on the other end of Narinkka Square.

See also
 Kluuvi
 Punavuori

References

 
Kampinmalmi district